The women's 4 × 800 metres relay at the 2017 IAAF World Relays was held at the Thomas Robinson Stadium on 22 April.

Just before the gun, Kenya's Eglay Nafuna Nalanya flinched, almost disqualifying their team, but she righted herself before the gun.  The first runner to the break line was American Chanelle Price who found her way to the front followed closely by Nalanya and Australian Lora Storey.  All five teams sorted themselves out into a string, with Poland's Anna Sabat the first to fall behind.  After shadowing  Price through most of the first leg, Nalanya slowed during the last 150 metres leaving Storey and Belarus' Darya Barysevich as the only chasers.  Shortly after the first handoff, Chrishuna Williams broke away for the American team.  That lead was temporary as Australian Abbey De La Motte and Belarus' Ilona Usovich not only pulled in the gap but went past Williams.  De La Motte continued the momentum and put a gap on both of her pursuers handing off to Zoe Buckman with almost a 10-metre lead.  Williams finally put on a strong kick finish to separate from Usovich, slightly pulling in De La Motte's big lead.

During the first 200 metres of the third leg, American Laura Roesler pulled back the lead.  With 300 to go in their leg, Roesler passed Buckman with Belarus' Viktoria Kushnir making up the gap behind.  During the next 200 metres Roesler opened up a 20-metre lead while Kushnir eased past Buckman.  Roesler continued to expand the lead handing off to Charlene Lipsey with over a 30-metre advantage.  Kushnir separated from Buckman to hand off to  world Champion Marina Arzamasova with a comfortable gap.  Through the first lap, Arzamasova brought the gap down to just over 5 metres, with Australian Heidi See in tow 10 metres back.  From there, Lipsey began to open the gap again, separating ultimately to a 25-metre victory.  See closed the gap down to 4 metres but Arzamasova was stronger on the last 100 metres for a Belarus silver.

Records
Prior to the competition, the records were as follows:

Schedule

Results

Final
The final was started at 21:51.

References

4 x 800 metres relay
4 × 800 metres relay
2017 in women's athletics